The Turgay Depression, also known as Turgay Basin, Turgay Trough, and Turgay Hollow, is a structural basin in Kazakhstan.

The depression is named after the Turgay River, which flows southwards along a stretch of the trough. 
The Lakes of the lower Turgay and Irgiz Nature Reserve is a protected area located in the southern sector of the basin.

Geography
The Turgay Depression runs across the Turgay Plateau in north-western Kazakhstan. It stretches from north to south and connects the West Siberian Plain to the north with the Turan Depression. The Ubagan River, a right tributary of the Tobol flows along it in the northern direction. Among the rivers flowing southwards, the main ones are the Turgay with its tributaries Irgiz and Ulkayak, including the Saryozen through the Tauysh channel, as well as the Uly-Zhylanshyk. The lowest parts of the depression are occupied by numerous lakes, with mostly saline or bittern-salty waters, such as Kushmurun, Koybagar, Tyuntyugur, Aksuat, Teniz, Sarymoin, Sarykopa, Akkol, Barakkol and Shalkarteniz.

Geologically the entire trough corresponds to the Turgai tectonic subsidence of ancient alluvial and lacustrine deposits. The Turgay Plateau rises between the Urals and Mugodzhar Hills in the west and the Kazakh Steppe in the east. Deposits of iron ore and other minerals occur in the basin, as well as significant oilfields in the southern part.

The northern part of the basin is characterized by steppe and the southern part by semi-desert, with the Barsuki Desert at the southern end near the Aral Sea. In the spring and summer, large swathes of it are used for pasture.

See also 
 Geology of Kazakhstan
 Kazakh Steppe
 Outline of plate tectonics

References

External links
Characteristics of strike-slip inversion structures of the Karatau fault and their petroleum geological significances in the south Turgay Basin, Kazakhstan
Kushmurun Lake - BirdLife Data Zone

Structural basins
Depressions of Kazakhstan